Kwame Oduro is a Ghanaian college soccer coach, currently serving as head coach of the St. Bonaventure Bonnies men's soccer team.

Career
Oduro was born in Accra and raised in Toronto. He played college soccer at Houghton College and Niagara University. In 2011, he joined the Canisius coaching staff as an assistant. In December 2014, he was hired by St. Bonaventure to be their head coach.

Personal life and education 
Born in Accra, Ghana until he moved to Toronto, Ontario. In 2007, Oduro earned his bachelor's degree in political science from Niagara. He earned his master's degrees in organizational leadership from Nyack College  and sports administration from Canisius. He is now the head coach for the St. Bonaventure Men's Soccer team and also spends time substituting at local high schools.

Achievements 
Oduro is a two-time MAAC All-Academic Team honoree and 2005 ESPN The Magazine. All MAAC Team. Academic All-District Second Team.

References

External links
St. Bonaventure bio

Living people
Ghanaian football managers
St. Bonaventure Bonnies men's soccer coaches
Sportspeople from Accra
Year of birth missing (living people)
1980s births